The 2009–10 New Orleans Hornets season was the team's 8th season of the franchise in the National Basketball Association (NBA).

Key dates
June 25 – The 2009 NBA draft took place in New York City.
July 8 – The free agency period started.
November 12 – After a 3–6 start, the Hornets become the first NBA team this season to fire its head coach, dismissing Byron Scott. General manager Jeff Bower is named new head coach. In addition, former head coach Tim Floyd was brought in as an assistant coach.
January 28 – Hornets point guard Chris Paul was selected as all-star reserve.

Summary

NBA Draft 2009

Free agency

Draft picks

Roster

Pre-season

Regular season

Standings

Record vs. opponents

Game log

|- bgcolor="#ffcccc"
| 1
| October 28
| @ San Antonio
| 
| Chris Paul (26)
| Emeka Okafor (10)
| Chris Paul (9)
| AT&T Center18,581
| 0-1
|- bgcolor="#bbffbb"
| 2
| October 30
| Sacramento
| 
| Chris Paul (31)
| Emeka Okafor (13)
| Chris Paul (4)
| New Orleans Arena17,306
| 1-1

|- bgcolor="#ffcccc"
| 3
| November 1
| @ Boston
| 
| Peja Stojakovic (26)
| Emeka Okafor (10)
| Chris Paul (8)
| TD Garden18,624
| 1-2
|- bgcolor="#ffcccc"
| 4
| November 2
| @ New York
| 
| Chris Paul (32)
| Emeka Okafor (10)
| Chris Paul (13)
| Madison Square Garden19,763
| 1-3
|- bgcolor="#bbffbb"
| 5
| November 4
| Dallas
| 
| Chris Paul (39)
| Emeka Okafor (13)
| Chris Paul (7)
| New Orleans Arena13,566
| 2-3
|- bgcolor="#ffcccc"
| 6
| November 6
| Toronto
| 
| Chris Paul (21)
| Emeka Okafor (8)
| Chris Paul (18)
| New Orleans Arena15,010
| 2-4
|- bgcolor="#ffcccc"
| 7
| November 8
| @ L. A. Lakers
| 
| Chris Paul (15)
| Emeka Okafor (14)
| Chris Paul (9)
| STAPLES Center18,997
| 2-5
|- bgcolor="#bbffbb"
| 8
| November 9
| @ L. A. Clippers
| 
| Devin Brown (25)
| David West (9)
| Chris Paul (10)
| STAPLES Center14,760
| 3-5
|- bgcolor="#ffcccc"
| 9
| November 11
| @ Phoenix
| 
| Chris Paul (25)
| Devin Brown (5)
| Chris Paul (6)
| US Airways Center16,517
| 3-6
|- bgcolor="#ffcccc"
| 10
| November 13
| Portland
| 
| Marcus Thornton (20)
| David West (10)
| Chris Paul (8)
| New Orleans Arena14,742
| 3-7
|- bgcolor="#ffcccc"
| 11
| November 14
| @ Atlanta
| 
| Peja Stojakovic (25)
| David West, Emeka Okafor (12)
| Bobby Brown (7)
| Philips Arena18,572
| 3-8
|- bgcolor="#bbffbb"
| 12
| November 17
| L. A. Clippers
| 
| David West (24)
| Emeka Okafor (14)
| Darren Collison (6)
| New Orleans Arena13,116
| 4-8
|- bgcolor="#bbffbb"
| 13
| November 19
| Phoenix
| 
| Peja Stojakovic (25)
| Peja Stojakovic (13)
| Devin Brown, Darren Collison, David West (5)
| New Orleans Arena14,520
| 5-8
|- bgcolor="#bbffbb"
| 14
| November 21
| Atlanta
| 
| Darren Collison (22)
| David West, Emeka Okafor (10)
| Darren Collison (11)
| New Orleans Arena15,933
| 6-8
|- bgcolor="#ffcccc"
| 15
| November 22
| @ Miami
| 
| Marcus Thornton (24)
| David West (9)
| Bobby Brown (7)
| AmericanAirlines Arena16,500
| 6-9
|- bgcolor="#bbffbb"
| 16
| November 25
| Milwaukee
| 
| David West (27)
| Emeka Okafor (13)
| Darren Collison (8)
| New Orleans Arena14,315
| 7-9
|- bgcolor="#ffcccc"
| 17
| November 29
| @ Sacramento
| 
| David West (24)
| Emeka Okafor (11)
| Darren Collison (6)
| Power Balance Pavilion11,548
| 7-10

|- bgcolor="#ffcccc"
| 18
| December 1
| @ L. A. Lakers
| 
| Darren Collison (20)
| Emeka Okafor (12)
| Devin Brown (8)
| STAPLES Center18,997
| 7-11
|- bgcolor="#bbffbb"
| 19
| December 4
| Minnesota
| 
| Devin Brown (19)
| Emeka Okafor (13)
| Chris Paul (15)
| New Orleans Arena14,720
| 8-11
|- bgcolor="#bbffbb"
| 20
| December 8
| Sacramento
| 
| David West (24)
| David West, Emeka Okafor (12)
| Chris Paul (12)
| New Orleans Arena13,140
| 9-11
|- bgcolor="#bbffbb"
| 21
| December 9
| @ Minnesota
| 
| Peja Stojakovic (21)
| David West, Emeka Okafor (6)
| Chris Paul (14)
| Target Center12,056
| 10-11
|- bgcolor="#ffcccc"
| 22
| December 11
| New York
| 
| David West (20)
| David West (7)
| Chris Paul (13)
| New Orleans Arena15,569
| 10-12
|- bgcolor="#ffcccc"
| 23
| December 14
| @ Dallas
| 
| Chris Paul (20)
| James Posey, Emeka Okafor (5)
| Chris Paul (16)
| American Airlines Center19,737
| 10-13
|- bgcolor="#bbffbb"
| 24
| December 16
| Detroit
| 
| David West (32)
| David West (12)
| Chris Paul (12)
| New Orleans Arena13,196
| 11-13
|- bgcolor="#bbffbb"
| 25
| December 18
| Denver
| 
| Chris Paul (30)
| Emeka Okafor (12)
| Chris Paul (19)
| New Orleans Arena14,453
| 12-13
|- bgcolor="#ffcccc"
| 26
| December 20
| @ Toronto
| 
| David West (21)
| David West (12)
| Chris Paul (7)
| Air Canada Centre15,790
| 12-14
|- bgcolor="#bbffbb"
| 27
| December 23
| Golden State
| 
| David West (21)
| David West (12)
| Chris Paul (7)
| New Orleans Arena14,391
| 13-14
|- bgcolor="#ffcccc"
| 28
| December 26
| @ Chicago
| 
| Devin Brown (22)
| Emeka Okafor (9)
| Chris Paul (7)
| United Center22,008
| 13-15
|- bgcolor="#ffcccc"
| 29
| December 29
| @ Houston
| 
| David West (44)
| David West (12)
| Chris Paul (10)
| Toyota Center18,187
| 13-16
|- bgcolor="#bbffbb"
| 30
| December 30
| Miami
| 
| David West (21)
| Emeka Okafor (14)
| Chris Paul (9)
| New Orleans Arena17,301
|14-16

|- bgcolor="#bbffbb"
| 31
| January 2
| Houston
| 
| Chris Paul (28)
| Emeka Okafor (16)
| Chris Paul (9)
| New Orleans Arena16,020
| 15-16
|- bgcolor="#bbffbb"
| 32
| January 4
| @ Utah
| 
| Devin Brown (30)
| David West (9)
| Chris Paul (9)
| EnergySolutions Arena19,911
| 16-16
|- bgcolor="#bbffbb"
| 33
| January 6
| @ Oklahoma City
| 
| David West (19)
| David West, Emeka Okafor (8)
| Chris Paul (13)
| Oklahoma City Arena17,836
| 17-16
|- bgcolor="#bbffbb"
| 34
| January 8
| New Jersey
| 
| David West (32)
| Emeka Okafor (13)
| Chris Paul (18)
| New Orleans Arena15,555
| 18-16
|- bgcolor="#bbffbb"
| 35
| January 10
| @ Washington
| 
| Chris Paul (26)
| Emeka Okafor (7)
| Chris Paul (14)
| Verizon Center14,753
| 19-16
|- bgcolor="#ffcccc"
| 36
| January 11
| @ Philadelphia
| 
| Emeka Okafor (20)
| David West (13)
| Chris Paul (14)
| Wachovia Center11,518
| 19-17
|- bgcolor="#bbffbb"
| 37
| January 13
| L. A. Clippers
| 
| Emeka Okafor (21)
| David West (8)
| Chris Paul (15)
| New Orleans Arena14,348
| 20-17
|- bgcolor="#ffcccc"
| 38
| January 15
| @ Detroit
| 
| David West (25)
| David West (9)
| Chris Paul (14)
| The Palace of Auburn Hills17,446
| 20-18
|- bgcolor="#bbffbb"
| 39
| January 16
| @ Indiana
| 
| David West (24)
| Emeka Okafor (12)
| Chris Paul (11)
| Conseco Fieldhouse13,376
| 21-18
|- bgcolor="#ffcccc"
| 40
| January 18
| San Antonio
| 
| Chris Paul, David West (18)
| James Posey (10)
| Chris Paul (9)
| New Orleans Arena16,549
| 21-19
|- bgcolor="#bbffbb"
| 41
| January 20
| Memphis
| 
| Chris Paul, David West (21)
| David West (13)
| Chris Paul (13)
| New Orleans Arena14,238
| 22-19
|- bgcolor="#bbffbb"
| 42
| January 22
| @ Minnesota
| 
| Chris Paul (23)
| Emeka Okafor (10)
| Chris Paul (9)
| Target Center17,101
| 23-19
|- bgcolor="#ffcccc"
| 43
| January 23
| @ Denver
| 
| Chris Paul (26)
| Emeka Okafor (10)
| Chris Paul (10)
| Pepsi Center19,807
| 23-20
|- bgcolor="#bbffbb"
| 44
| January 25
| @ Portland
| 
| Chris Paul (24)
| Emeka Okafor (9)
| Chris Paul (12)
| Rose Garden Arena20,249
| 24-20
|- bgcolor="#bbffbb"
| 45
| January 27
| @ Golden State
| 
| Chris Paul (38)
| David West, Emeka Okafor (12)
| Chris Paul (9)
| Oracle Arena16,308
| 25-20
|- bgcolor="#ffcccc"
| 46
| January 29
| Chicago
| 
| David West (29)
| David West (14)
| Chris Paul (12)
| New Orleans Arena16,578
| 25-21
|- bgcolor="#bbffbb"
| 47
| January 30
| @ Memphis
| 
| David West (22)
| Emeka Okafor (10)
| Darren Collison (18)
| FedEx Forum12,317
| 26-21

|- bgcolor="#ffcccc"
| 48
| February 1
| Phoenix
| 
| Marcus Thornton (25)
| David West, James Posey (8)
| Darren Collison (14)
| New Orleans Arena13,874
| 26-22
|- bgcolor="#ffcccc"
| 49
| February 3
| Oklahoma City
| 
| Marcus Thornton (22)
| Emeka Okafor (12)
| Darren Collison (9)
| New Orleans Arena12,884
| 26-23
|- bgcolor="#ffcccc"
| 50
| February 5
| Philadelphia
| 
| Peja Stojakovic (23)
| James Posey (10)
| James Posey (6)
| New Orleans Arena15,162
| 26-24
|- bgcolor="#bbffbb"
| 51
| February 6
| @ Charlotte
| 
| Darren Collison (24)
| James Posey (8)
| Darren Collison, David West, Morris Peterson (4)
| Time Warner Cable Arena19,164
| 27-24
|- bgcolor="#ffcccc"
| 52
| February 8
| @ Orlando
| 
| Peja Stojakovic (29)
| Peja Stojakovic (9)
| Darren Collison (9)
| Amway Arena17,461
| 27-25
|- bgcolor="#bbffbb"
| 53
| February 10
| Boston
| 
| Darren Collison (25)
| Morris Peterson (10)
| Darren Collison (9)
| New Orleans Arena14,848
| 28-25
|- align="center"
|colspan="9" bgcolor="#bbcaff"|All-Star Break
|- bgcolor="#ffcccc"
| 54
| February 17
| Utah
| 
| Darren Collison, Peja Stojakovic (24)
| Emeka Okafor (10)
| Darren Collison (9)
| New Orleans Arena13,561
| 28-26
|- bgcolor="#bbffbb"
| 55
| February 19
| Indiana
| 
| David West (29)
| Darren Collison, Emeka Okafor (13)
| Darren Collison (12)
| New Orleans Arena15,644
| 29-26
|- bgcolor="#bbffbb"
| 56
| February 21
| Houston
| 
| David West (27)
| Emeka Okafor (11)
| Darren Collison (9)
| New Orleans Arena14,504
| 30-26
|- bgcolor="#ffcccc"
| 57
| February 23
| @ Cleveland
| 
| Marcus Thornton (37)
| James Posey (9)
| Darren Collison (10)
| Quicken Loans Arena20,562
| 30-27
|- bgcolor="#ffcccc"
| 58
| February 24
| @ Milwaukee
| 
| Marcus Thornton (25)
| David West (9)
| Darren Collison (9)
| Bradley Center11,936
| 30-28
|- bgcolor="#bbffbb"
| 59
| February 26
| Orlando
| 
| David West (40)
| David West (10)
| Darren Collison (7)
| Bradley Center16,954
| 31-28
|- bgcolor="#ffcccc"
| 60
| February 28
| @ Dallas
| 
| Darren Collison (35)
| Emeka Okafor (17)
| David West (6)
| American Airlines Center19,911
| 31-29
 
|- bgcolor="#ffcccc"
| 61
| March 1
| San Antonio
| 
| Marcus Thornton (30)
| David West (9)
| Darren Collison (15)
| New Orleans Arena13,655
| 31-30
|- bgcolor="#ffcccc"
| 62
| March 3
| Memphis
| 
| Marcus Thornton (24)
| Peja Stojakovic (9)
| Darren Collison (14)
| New Orleans Arena14,347
| 31-31
|- bgcolor="#ffcccc"
| 63
| March 5
| @ San Antonio
| 
| Darren Collison (32)
| David West (9)
| David West (7)
| AT&T Center18,581
| 31-32
|- bgcolor="#bbffbb"
| 64
| March 8
| Golden State
| 
| David West, Marcus Thornton (28)
| David West (13)
| Darren Collison (20)
| New Orleans Arena13,889
| 32-32
|- bgcolor="#ffcccc"
| 65
| March 10
| @ Oklahoma City
| 
| David West (33)
| Aaron Gray (7)
| Darren Collison (9)
| Oklahoma City Arena18,203
| 32-33
|- bgcolor="#ffcccc"
| 66
| March 12
| Denver
| 
| David West (30)
| Emeka Okafor (9)
| Darren Collison (10)
| New Orleans Arena17,220
| 32-34
|- bgcolor="#ffcccc"
| 67
| March 14
| @ Phoenix
| 
| Marcus Thornton (28)
| Emeka Okafor (12)
| Darren Collison (10)
| US Airways Center18,218
| 32-35
|- bgcolor="#bbffbb"
| 68
| March 15
| @ L. A. Clippers
| 
| David West (24)
| Emeka Okafor (14)
| Darren Collison (14)
| STAPLES Center15,617
| 33-35
|- bgcolor="#ffcccc"
| 69
| March 17
| @ Golden State
| 
| David West (36)
| David West (15)
| Darren Collison (14)
| Oracle Arena17,155
| 33-36
|- bgcolor="#ffcccc"
| 70
| March 18
| @ Denver
| 
| Darren Collison, Marcus Thornton (15)
| Emeka Okafor (10)
| Darren Collison (6)
| Pepsi Center19,155
| 33-37
|- bgcolor="#ffcccc"
| 71
| March 20
| @ Utah
| 
| Marcus Thornton (22)
| Aaron Gray (11)
| Darren Collison (6)
| EnergySolutions Arena18,766
| 33-38
|- bgcolor="#bbffbb"
| 72
| March 22
| Dallas
| 
| Marcus Thornton (28)
| David West, Emeka Okafor (6)
| David West (10)
| New Orleans Arena14,047
| 34-38
|- bgcolor="#ffcccc"
| 73
| March 24
| Cleveland
| 
| Marcus Thornton (20)
| Emeka Okafor (10)
| Chris Paul‚ Darren Collison (7)
| New Orleans Arena18,008
| 34-39
|- bgcolor="#ffcccc"
| 74
| March 27
| Portland
| 
| Darren Collison (22)
| Aaron Gray (6)
| Chris Paul (10)
| New Orleans Arena16,475
| 34-40
|- bgcolor="#bbffbb"
| 75
| March 29
| L. A. Lakers
| 
| David West (20)
| Emeka Okafor (13)
| Chris Paul (13)
| New Orleans Arena18,206
| 35-40
|- bgcolor="#ffcccc"
| 76
| March 31
| Washington
| 
| David West (18)
| Aaron Gray (7)
| Chris Paul (9)
| New Orleans Arena14,634
| 35-41
 
|- bgcolor="#ffcccc"
| 77
| April 2
| @ Memphis
| 
| Marcus Thornton (19)
| David West (9)
| Chris Paul (8)
| FedEx Forum15,043
| 35-42
|- bgcolor="#ffcccc"
| 78
| April 3
| @ New Jersey
| 
| David West (25)
| Marcus Thornton (8)
| David West, Chris Paul (6)
| Izod Center14,698
| 35-43
|- bgcolor="#ffcccc"
| 79
| April 7
| Charlotte
| 
| Marcus Thornton (36)
| Emeka Okafor (9)
| Darren Collison (9)
| New Orleans Arena13,333
| 35-44
|- bgcolor="#ffcccc"
| 80
| April 9
| Utah
| 
| Darren Collison (28)
| Emeka Okafor (8)
| Darren Collison, Marcus Thornton (7)
| New Orleans Arena16,624
| 35-45
|- bgcolor="#bbffbb"
| 81
| April 11
| Minnesota
| 
| Emeka Okafor (23)
| David West (12)
| Darren Collison (11)
| New Orleans Arena14,931
| 36-45
|- bgcolor="#bbffbb"
| 82
| April 14
| @ Houston
| 
| David West (35)
| David West (10)
| Darren Collison (11)
| Toyota Center18,191
| 37-45

Player statistics

Regular season 

|-
| 
| 18 || 0 || 13.3 || .380 || . || .464 || 3.4 || .9 || .4 || .4 || 2.8 
|-
| 
| 22 || 0 || 14.9 || .395 || .258 || style="background:#FDB827;color:#FFFFFF;" | 1.000 || .8 || 2.1 || .4 || .0 || 6.6 
|-
| 
| 39 || 37 || 24.8 || .393 || .367 || .802 || 2.8 || 1.5 || .8 || .1 || 9.7 
|-
| 
| 76 || 37 || 27.8 || .477 || .400 || .851 || 2.5 || 5.7 || 1.0 || .1 || 12.4 
|-
| 
| 24 || 0 || 10.9 || .557 || . || .857 || 3.8 || .8 || .4 || .5 || 3.6 
|-
| 
| 4 || 0 || 4.3 || style="background:#FDB827;color:#FFFFFF;" | 1.000 || . || . || .5 || 1.3 || .3 || .3 || .5
|-
| 
| 14 || 0 || 5.4 || .500 || . || .400 || 1.6 || .1 || .0 || .2 || .7
|-
| 
| style="background:#FDB827;color:#FFFFFF;" | 82 || style="background:#FDB827;color:#FFFFFF;" | 82 || 28.9 || .530 || . || .562 || style="background:#FDB827;color:#FFFFFF;" | 9.0 || .7 || .7 || style="background:#FDB827;color:#FFFFFF;" | 1.5 || 10.4
|-
| 
| 45 || 45 || style="background:#FDB827;color:#FFFFFF;" | 38.0 || .493 || style="background:#FDB827;color:#FFFFFF;" | .409 || .847 || 4.2 || style="background:#FDB827;color:#FFFFFF;" | 10.7 || style="background:#FDB827;color:#FFFFFF;" | 2.1 || .2 || 18.7
|-
| 
| 46 || 39 || 21.2 || .385 || .363 || .611 || 2.7 || .9 || .5 || .1 || 7.1
|-
| 
| 77 || 2 || 22.5 || .365 || .335 || .825 || 4.3 || 1.5 || .5 || .2 || 5.2
|-
| 
| 75 || 1 || 18.8 || .494 || .167 || .811 || 3.1 || .9 || .8 || .2 || 7.2
|-
| 
| 62 || 55 || 31.4 || .404 || .375 || .897 || 3.7 || 1.5 || .8 || .1 || 12.6
|-
| 
| 73 || 17 || 25.6 || .451 || .374 || .814 || 2.9 || 1.6 || .8 || .2 || 14.5
|-
| 
| 81 || 81 || 36.4 || .505 || .259 || .865 || 7.5 || 3.0 || .9 || .7 || style="background:#FDB827;color:#FFFFFF;" | 19.0
|-
| 
| 68 || 14 || 12.8 || .500 || .333 || .610 || 2.1 || .6 || .4 || .3 || 3.8
|}

Awards, records and milestones

Awards

Week/Month

 Chris Paul was named Western Conference Player of the Month for February.
 Darren Collison was named Western Conference Rookie of the Month for February.

All-Star

 Chris Paul was selected as an All-Star reserve (third All-Star appearance; did not play due to injury).

Season

Darren Collison, NBA All-Rookie Team 1st Team
Marcus Thornton, NBA All-Rookie Team 2nd Team

Records
 On January 30, Darren Collison set a Hornets record for assists by a rookie with 18 against the Memphis Grizzlies.
 On February 23, Marcus Thornton set a Hornets record for most points scored in a quarter with 23.

Milestones

Injuries and surgeries

Transactions

Trades

Free agents

Additions

Subtractions

References

External links
2009–10 New Orleans Hornets season at ESPN
2009–10 New Orleans Hornets season at Basketball Reference

New Orleans Hornets seasons
New Orleans